Tansian University (TANU) is located in Umunya, Oyi Local Government Area, Anambra State in Nigeria. It is a private Christian University. It started in Oba, Idemili South Local Government Area as a temporary site, before the permanent site was set up in Umunya. It was founded by Rev Msgr Prof John Bosco Akam. Although, Tansian University is a Private University, the Anambra State government under Governor Peter Obi donated cash and vehicles for its infrastructural upgrade and development. In 2021, Tansian University lost its Founder, Rev Msgr Prof John Akam to death.

Mission

To foster the individual student's intellectual, personal, cultural, and ethical development; 
to build knowledge and restore the pride of the black man by way of a Human Development; 
Total Man Concept driven curriculum; employing innovative, leading edge; teaching and learning methods; 
research and professional services that encourage integrated, life-applicable, life-transforming education, relevant to the context of Science, Technology and Human Capacity Building.

Location and Founder

Tansian University (TANU) is located in Umunya, Oyi Local Government Area, Anambra State in Nigeria. It is a private Christian university. It was founded by Rev Prof John Bosco Akam.

Faculties and courses offered in Tansian University 
The list of courses offered in Tansian University include the following:

FACULTY OF NATURAL AND APPLIED SCIENCES 
Biochemistry

Chemistry

Computer Science

Industrial Chemistry

Information and Communication Technology

Microbiology

Physics

Physics and Electronics

FACULTY OF MANAGEMENT AND SOCIAL SCIENCES 
Accounting

Banking and Finance

Business Administration

Mass Communication

Criminology and Security Studies

Statistics

Economics and Statistics

Economics

Political Science

International Relations

Public Administration

Mass Communication

Philosophy and Religious Studies

FACULTY OF EDUCATION 
(Special) Education

(Arts) Education

(Science) Education

Social Science and Vocational Education

FACULTY OF ENVIRONMENTAL SCIENCES 
Architecture

Estate Management

Urban and Regional Planning

FACULTY OF HEALTH SCIENCES 
Nursing Science

Medical Laboratory Science

Public Health

FACULTY OF LAW 
Civil Law

References

External links

Universities and colleges in Nigeria
Education in Anambra State
Educational institutions established in 2007
2007 establishments in Nigeria
Christian universities and colleges in Nigeria